Steaming or artificial humidity was the process of injecting steam from boilers into cotton weaving sheds in Lancashire, England, in the late 19th and early 20th centuries. The intention was to prevent breakages in short-staple Indian Surat cotton which was introduced in 1862 during a blockade of American cotton at the time of the American Civil War. There was considerable concern about the health implications of steaming. Believed to cause ill health, this practice became the subject of much campaigning and investigation from the 1880s to the 1920s. A number of Acts of Parliament imposed modifications.

Background
Warp yarns were strengthened by the addition of size – a substance made from flour and tallow or china clay. High humidity was required to weave sized yarn  and to minimise the size dust in the air. This was especially important when cloth companies were forced to use Indian Surat cotton instead of Sea Island cotton from South Carolina in 1862 during the American Civil War. The war occurred at a time of market collapse, and the resulting cotton famine caused speculation and restructuring. This was far harder to weave; the weavers, who were paid by the piece, at first gladly accepted the artificially induced humidity.
 
Humidity was frequently achieved by injecting steam through pipes into the weaving sheds. The resulting damp conditions caused health risks and considerable discomfort to cotton workers, especially in sheds with poor ventilation. The water was recycled, creating favourable conditions for the propagation of contagious diseases and the accumulation of toxic substances in dyes. Robert Koch discovered the tubercule bacillus in 1882, though the way in which the bacillus was transmitted was not yet understood, allowing the potential question that steaming might be associated with the transmission of tuberculosis.

Cotton Cloth Factory Act 1889 

The 1887 Annual Report of the Medical Officer of Health for Blackburn, a Dr. Stephenson, referred to the "abominable system of saturating the atmosphere of workshops by means of steam", a practice which he believed led to "the wholesale slaughtering of the inhabitants". During 1889, the Amalgamated Weavers' Association, founded in 1884, campaigned with the Northern Counties Factory Act Reform Association against the practice of steaming. These stipulations, however, were not sufficient to satisfy the weavers, who still hoped for steaming to be abolished. In May 1895, over 200 weavers from two mills in Padiham went on strike against steaming in their mills. The Amalgamated Weavers' Association found that the practice of steaming was increasing during the 1890s, especially in Burnley and Padiham.

In 1892, a Royal Commission on Labour found that there had been very few prosecutions under the 1889 Act. The workings of the 1889 Act were investigated some years later by a Government committee chaired by Sir Henry Enfield Roscoe. Working conditions did not appear to have greatly improved, as the report also referred to a claim by cotton workers that they were being "stewed alive by Act of Parliament".

Factory Act 1901 

Four years after Roscoe's report, the Factory Act of 1901 obliged cotton employers to ensure that water for steaming came from a pure source or was suitably purified. This Act also stipulated that artificial humidity (steaming) should cease when the wet bulb of the hygrometer exceeded 75%. Two hygrometers were to be provided in each humid shed, with further hygrometers where more than 700 looms were present.

Cotton Cloth Factories Act 1911 

In 1906 when the Amalgamated Weavers' Association balloted its members on steaming, a vast majority were in favour of its abolition. A further Government enquiry resulted, chaired by Sir Hamilton Freer-Smith. In 1909, Freer-Smith's report: Departmental Committee on Humidity and Ventilation in Cotton Weaving Sheds, was published. The committee had included cotton mill employers and Trade Union representatives; the two sides disagreed on an upper level of humidity. Employers wanted a 75% "wet bulb" limit, whereas union members, who would have preferred abolition, sought a compromise of 70%. The subsequent Cotton Cloth Factories Act of 1911, however, specified a wet bulb limit of 75%.

Cotton Cloth Factories Act 1929 

The controversy continued until the late 1920s. The 1928 Home Office Report of the Departmental Committee on Artificial Humidity in Cotton Cloth Factories by J. Jackson recommended that, for comfort, steaming should cease when the hygrometer wet bulb reached 72.5%. This became law under the Cotton Cloth Factories Act of 1929. Despite previous beliefs, the report concluded that there was no evidence that humid sheds caused more harm to health than dry sheds and that to abolish steaming would hinder trade by increasing manufacturing costs.`

See also
Kissing the shuttle
Mule spinners' cancer

Notes

References

Bibliography

Additional sources
 The National Archives (United Kingdom): Cotton Cloth Factories Act 1889 Retrieved 6 June 2014
 
 The National Archives (United Kingdom): Cotton Cloth Factories Act 1911 Retrieved 6 June 2014
 Google Books: Wharton's Concise Dictionary by Ar Lakshmanan and John Jane Smith Wharton Cotton Cloth Factories Act 1929 Retrieved 6 June 2014
 Google Books: Departmental Committee on Humidity and Ventilation in Cotton Weaving Sheds by Sir Hamilton Freer-Smith (H.M. Stationery Office, 1909) Retrieved 6 June 2014

Cotton industry in England
Weaving
History of Lancashire
United Kingdom labour law